Shamanov (Russian: Шаманов) is a Russian masculine surname originating from the noun shaman; its feminine counterpart is Shamanova. The surname may refer to:

Boris Shamanov (1931–2008), Russian painter
 Nina Shamanova (born 1937), Russian rower
Tatiana Shamanova (born 1992), Russian cyclist 
Vladimir Shamanov (born 1957), Russian general 

Russian-language surnames